Death Song is the fifth studio album by American psychedelic rock band The Black Angels released on April 21, 2017, 4 years after their last album Indigo Meadow. Recording took place during September 2016 at Arlyn, Avast! and Electrokitty Recording Studios. Phil Ek produced, mixed and engineered the album.

Reception

The album was released to generally favorable reviews scoring 75 on aggregate website Metacritic, based on 12 reviews. Giving the album 3.5 out of 5 stars, AllMusic critic Mark Deming said of the album "Death Song is an album that's big on cool sounds and not as strong in terms of songs (despite the title), and if you're searching for compelling melodies or hooks, this album may not be your cup of acid. But if you're in the market for an album that will summon the dark atmospheres, Death Song certainly delivers the goods, and it demonstrates that the Black Angels slowly but surely improve each time they go into the studio." Paste Magazine's Beverly Bryan gave the album 8.8 out of 10 in a rave review and said "...a dark, mysterious and sweeping record that returns to the combination of politics and mysticism that made their gritty anti-war themed first album Passover so fascinating.

Track listing

Personnel

The Black Angels
 Christian Bland –  bass, guitar, mellotron, vox continental, vocals,  
 Stephanie Bailey – drums, electric organ
 Jake Garcia – bass, guitar, vocals 
 Kyle Hunt – bass, guitar, Moog synthesizer, organ
 Alex Maas – bass, harmonium, vocals

Technical and design personnel
 Phil Ek – engineering, mixing, producing
 Greg Calbi – mastering 
 Joe Hogyn – assistant Engineer   
 Cameron Nicklaus – assistant Engineer 
 Jacob Sciba – assistant Engineer 
 Pierre Schmidt – Album artwork

Charts

References

The Black Angels (band) albums
Albums produced by Phil Ek
Partisan Records albums
2017 albums